Hinkleyia caperata is a species of gastropod belonging to the family Lymnaeidae.

The species is found in Northern America.

References

Lymnaeidae